In enzymology, a NAD(P)+-protein-arginine ADP-ribosyltransferase is an enzyme that catalyzes the chemical reaction using nicotinamide adenine dinucleotide

NAD+ + protein L-arginine  nicotinamide + Nomega-(ADP-D-ribosyl)-protein-L-arginine NADP+ + protein L-arginine  nicotinamide + Nomega-[(2'-phospho-ADP)-D-ribosyl]-protein-L-arginine

as well as the corresponding reaction using nicotinamide adenine dinucleotide phosphate

NADP+ + protein L-arginine  nicotinamide + Nomega-(ADP-D-ribosyl)-protein-L-arginine NADP+ + protein L-arginine  nicotinamide + Nomega-[(2'-phospho-ADP)-D-ribosyl]-protein-L-arginine

Thus, the two substrates of this enzyme are NAD+ (or NADP+) and protein L-arginine,  whereas its two products are nicotinamide and Nomega-(ADP-D-ribosyl)-protein-L-arginine (or Nomega-[(2'-phospho-ADP)-D-ribosyl]-protein-L-arginine, respectively).

This enzyme belongs to the family of glycosyltransferases, specifically the pentosyltransferases.  The systematic name of this enzyme class is NAD(P)+:protein-L-arginine ADP-D-ribosyltransferase. Other names in common use include ADP-ribosyltransferase, mono(ADP-ribosyl)transferase, NAD+:L-arginine ADP-D-ribosyltransferase, NAD(P)+-arginine ADP-ribosyltransferase, and NAD(P)+:L-arginine ADP-D-ribosyltransferase.

At least five forms of the enzyme have been characterised to date, some of which are attached to the membrane via glycosylphosphatidylinositol (GPI) anchors, while others appear to be secreted. The enzymes contain ~250-300 residues, which encode putative signal sequences and carbohydrate attachment sites. In addition, the N- and C-termini are predominantly hydrophobic, a characteristic of GPI-anchored proteins.

Structural studies

References

Further reading
 
 
 

EC 2.4.2
NADPH-dependent enzymes
NADH-dependent enzymes
Enzymes of known structure